Tuberolachnus salignus, or the giant willow aphid, is a species of aphid, in the genus Tuberolachnus. They are reputed to be the largest aphids, with a body length of up to 5.8mm. First described by Johann Friedrich Gmelin in 1790, it feeds on many species of willow (Salix species), and has one known specific parasite, Pauesia salignae.

Host plants 
Tuberolachnus salignus is known to feed primarily on willow and Salix tree species such as the white willow (Salix alba), the common sallow (Salix cinerea) and the Indian willow (Salix tetrasperma). The following host tree species have also been recorded:

 Quince (Cydonia oblonga)
 Apple (Malus spp.)
 Poplar (Populus spp.)

References

Further reading 
 
 
 Mittler, T.E. 1957: Studies on the feeding and nutrition of Tuberolachnus salignus (Gmelin) (Homoptera, Aphididae) I. The uptake of phloem sap. Journal of Experimental Biology, 34: 334-341. Abstract and full article (PDF)

Lachninae
Hemiptera of Europe
Insects described in 1790
Taxa named by Johann Friedrich Gmelin